Bisi Silva (Olabisi Obafunke Silva) (29 May 1962 – 12 February 2019) was a Nigerian contemporary art curator based in Lagos.

Biography
Bisi Silva graduated with an MA in Visual Arts Administration: Curating and Commissioning Contemporary Art at the Royal College of Art, London, in 1996. In the early days of her career, Silva worked as an independent curator and founded Fourth Dial Art, a non-profit project in London dedicated to promoting and cultivating cultural practice in the visual arts, and to help artists form meaningful collaborations with artistic institutions and professionals. One of the outcomes of Fourth Dial Art was a traveling exhibition, “Heads of State”, featuring the work of Faisal Abdu'Allah, who was then an emerging artist of the London art world.

She visited Lagos, Nigeria in 1999 with the idea of starting a project there. Silva was the founder and artistic director of the Centre for Contemporary Art, Lagos (CCA, Lagos), which opened in December 2007. CCA Lagos promotes research, documentation and exhibitions related to contemporary art in Africa and abroad. At CCA, Lagos, Silva curated numerous exhibitions, including one with the Nigerian painter Ndidi Dike. Silva was also the founder of the Asiko Art School, which describes itself as "part art workshop, part residency, and part art academy."

She was co-curator of “The Progress of Love”, a transcontinental collaboration across three venues in the United States and Nigeria (October 2012 – January 2013). Silva was co-curator of J. D. 'Okhai Ojeikere: Moments of Beauty, Kiasma, Helsinki (April – November 2011). She was also co-curator for the second Thessaloniki Biennale of Contemporary Art, Greece, Praxis: Art in Times of Uncertainty in September 2009. In 2006, Silva was one of the curators for the Dakar Biennale in Senegal. In collaboration with the Portuguese art critic Isabel Carlos, she selected artists for the third Artes Mundi prize in Wales. She also curated Contact Zone: Contemporary Art from West and North Africa (October 2007) and an exhibition titled Telling ... Contemporary Finnish photography, in the Seventh Biennial of African Photography in Bamako (November 2007).

Silva wrote on contemporary art for international publications, including Art Monthly, Untitled, Third Text, M Metropolis, Agufon and for Nigerian newspapers such as This Day. She was on the editorial board of n.paradoxa, an international feminist art journal, and was the guest editor for the Africa and African diaspora issue of n.paradoxa (January 2013).

Silva died in Lagos, Nigeria, at the age of 56 after a four-year battle with breast cancer.

Curators Nina Zimmer and Touria El Glaoui named Silva among the decade's most influential curators.

Exhibitions curated or co-curated

2009 
In the Light of Play, Durban Art Gallery and Johannesburg Art Fair
Chance Encounters, Seven Contemporary Artists from Africa, Sakshi Gallery, Mumbai India e Sakshi Gallery, Taipei, Taiwan
Like A Virgin ..., Lucy Azubuike (NIG) and Zanele Muholi (SA), CCA, Lagos
Praxis: Art in Times of Uncertainty, Second Thessaloniki Biennale of Contemporary Art, Greece
Maputo: A tale of One City, Oslo, part of the Africa in Oslo season.

2008  
George Osodi, Paradise Lost: Revisiting the Niger Delta, CCA, Lagos
Ndidi Dike, Waka-into-bondage: The Last ¾ Mile, CCA, Lagos

2007  
Fela, Ghariokwu Lemi and The Art of the Album Cover, CCA, Lagos
Contact Zone: Contemporary Art from West and North Africa, National Museum of Mali
Telling... Contemporary Finnish photography, Settima Biennale di Fotografia Africana, Bamako

2006  
Dak'Art, Biennale di Dakar, Senegal

Bibliography
Jayne O. Ifekwunigwe: Mixed Race Studies: A Reader — Routledge, 2004.

References

External links

Bisi Silva's blog
Centre for Contemporary Art, Lagos
Bisi Silva on powerofculture.nl 
Bisi Silva Obituary On NaijaGists.com
Bisi Silva Obituary, Artforum, 12 March 2019 
Bisi Silva remembered in Aperture. 1 Feb 2019 
On AICA website, UK  
On Art Throb, South Africa 
On Africa's Country 
Arts Council of African studies Association 
Art Africa Magazine 
ContemporaryAnd tribute 
Nigerian Tribune 
Jumoke Sanwo Bisi Silva 1962–2019 African Arts: The MIT Press  Volume 52, Number 4, Winter 2019  
In Memoriam: Okwui Enwezor and Bisi Silva

1962 births
2019 deaths
Yoruba women artists
Nigerian artists
Place of birth missing
People from Lagos
People from London
Nigerian art curators
Nigerian women curators
Alumni of the Royal College of Art
Deaths from breast cancer
Deaths from cancer in Nigeria
Residents of Lagos